SLIT-ROBO Rho GTPase activating protein 2C is a protein in humans that is encoded by the SRGAP2C gene.

Cortical development gene Slit-Robo Rho GTPase-activating protein 2 (SRGAP2) has been highly conserved over mammalian evolution, and human is the only lineage wherein gene duplications have occurred (three times). The promoter and first nine exons of SRGAP2 duplicated from 1q23.1 (SRGAP2A) to 1q21.1 (SRGAP2B) ∼3.4 million years ago (mya). Two larger duplications later copied SRGAP2B to chromosome 1p12 (SRGAP2C) and to proximal 1q21.1 (SRGAP2D) ∼2.4 and ∼1 mya, respectively. Ancestral SRGAP2A and the derived SRGAP2C copy are fixed at diploid copy number two. In contrast, the SRGAP2B and SRGAP2D are highly copy number polymorphic, with normal individuals identified that completely lack these paralogscopies. SRGAP2C is the most likely duplicate to encode a functional protein and is among the most fixed human-specific duplicate genes. Incomplete duplication created a novel gene function—antagonizing parental SRGAP2 function immediately “at birth” 2–3 mya, which is a time corresponding to the transition from Australopithecus to Homo and the beginning of neocortex expansion.

SRGAP2C is expressed in the human brain and dimerizes with ancestral SRGAP2 to antagonize it. In the mouse neocortex, SRGAP2 promotes spine maturation and limits spine density. SRGAP2C phenocopies SRGAP2 deficiency and underlies sustained radial migration and results in the emergence of human-specific features, including neoteny during spine maturation and increased density of longer spines. It appears that the SRGAP2C ultimately assumed the antagonistic function of the SRGAP2B duplicate, which shows evidence of pseudogenization in contemporary humans. It is unlikely that SRGAP2B and SRGAP2D are now functional as SRGAP2B has a markedly reduced expression in human brain compared to SRGAP2C and the transcripts produced by SRGAP2D lack two internal exons, leading to a premature termination codon.

References